Romuald Rodrigue (born 5 June 1929 at Saint-Georges, Quebec) was a Ralliement créditiste and Social Credit party member of the House of Commons of Canada. He was an accountant, administrator and manager by career.

Rodrigue attended high school at Saint-George-de-Beauce and studied at Saint-Georges Seminary. He was elected at the Beauce riding in the 1968 general election and served one term, the 28th Canadian Parliament. Initially, his party was known as the Ralliement créditiste; in April 1971, it became known as Social Credit. Rodrigue left federal politics after he was defeated at Beauce in the 1972 and 1974 federal elections.

References

External links
 

1929 births
Living people
Canadian accountants
Members of the House of Commons of Canada from Quebec
People from Saint-Georges, Quebec
Social Credit Party of Canada MPs